Denis Kulbayev (born 9 February 1975) is a retired Tajikistani footballer who played for the Tajikistan national football team.

Career statistics

International

International Goals

Honours
Dynamo Dushanbe
Tajik League (1): 1996
Varzob Dushanbe
Tajik League (1): 1999
Tajik Cup (1): 1999

References

External links

1975 births
Living people
Tajikistani footballers
Tajikistan international footballers
Association football forwards
Tajikistani people of Russian descent